Ashleigh Dallas is an Australian country music singer-songwriter and multi-instrumentalist.

Life and career

Early life
Ashleigh Dallas was born in Tamworth, NSW. Her father, Brett Dallas is a Golden Guitar winner and producer and her grandfather, Rex Dallas is an Australian Roll of Renown recipient and Golden Guitar winner. Dallas recalls performing from the age of five in her grandfather's barn. She wrote her first song when she was 12 years old.

2013–present: Career beginnings 
Dallas released her debut album, Dancing with a Ghost in September 2013. In 2014, Dallas won the Qantaslink New Talent of the Year at the Country Music Awards of Australia. 

Dallas released her second studio album, Other Side of Town in August 2015.

In 2022, Dallas, won Female Artist of the Year and Video of the Year for "Long Way 'Round" at the Country Music Awards of Australia.

Personal life
In 2019, Ashleigh gave birth to Harriet Lynn Dallas.

Discography

Albums

Awards and nominations

Country Music Awards of Australia
The Country Music Awards of Australia (CMAA) (also known as the Golden Guitar Awards) is an annual awards night held in January during the Tamworth Country Music Festival, celebrating recording excellence in the Australian country music industry. They have been held annually since 1973.
 (wins only)
|+ Awards and nominations for Ashleigh Dallas
| 2014
| Ashleigh Dallas
| New Talent of the Year
| 
|-
| 2018
| Lighthouse
| Traditional Country Album of the Year
| 
|-
|rowspan=2| 2022
| Ashleigh Dallas
| Female Vocalist of the Year
| 
|-
| "Long Way 'Round"
| Video of the Year
| 
|-
| 2023
| In the Moment
| Traditional Country Album of the Year
| 
|-

References

1994 births
Living people
Australian country singer-songwriters
Australian women singer-songwriters
21st-century Australian singers
21st-century Australian women singers